Jean-Paul Marchand (born 13 September 1944) was a member of the House of Commons of Canada from 1993 to 2000. He is a professor and author by career.

Born in Penetanguishene, Ontario, Marchand taught philosophy at the University of Manitoba, the University of Ottawa and Université Laval.

He was elected in the Quebec East electoral district under the Bloc Québécois party in the 1993 and 1997 federal elections, thus serving in the 35th and 36th Canadian Parliaments. He was defeated in the 2000 federal election and thus left Canadian politics.

Works

References

External links
 

1944 births
Living people
Bloc Québécois MPs
Members of the House of Commons of Canada from Quebec
People from Penetanguishene
Franco-Ontarian people
Academic staff of Université Laval
Academic staff of the University of Ottawa
Academic staff of the University of Manitoba